Norway was represented by Åse Kleveland, with the song "Intet er nytt under solen", at the 1966 Eurovision Song Contest, which took place on 5 March in Luxembourg City. "Intet er nytt under solen" was chosen as the Norwegian entry at the Melodi Grand Prix on 5 February.

Before Eurovision

Melodi Grand Prix 1966
The MGP was held at Centralteatret in Oslo, hosted by Øivind Bergh. Five performers and songs took part in the final with each song sung twice by different singers, once with a small combo and once with a full orchestra. The winning song was chosen by voting from ten regional juries.

At Eurovision 
On the night of the final Kleveland performed 6th in the running order, following Yugoslavia and preceding Finland. "Intet er nytt under solen" was an unusual and adventurous song for Eurovision at the time, with a sophisticated, atmospheric instrumental arrangement, and a 5/4 time signature. Kleveland was the first female performer in Eurovision to appear on stage with a guitar, and the first female performer to appear in trousers rather than a dress or skirt. Voting was by each national jury awarding 5-3-1 to their top 3 songs, and at the close "Intet er nytt under solen" had picked up 15 points (5 from Italy, 3s from Austria, Spain and Sweden, and 1 from Germany), placing Norway third of the 18 entries. This was Norway's best Eurovision showing at the time, and would remain so until the victory of Bobbysocks! in 1985. Kleveland went on to present the 1986 contest in Bergen, the first to be hosted by Norway.

Voting

References

External links 
All national final performances on nrk.no

1966
Countries in the Eurovision Song Contest 1966
1966
Eurovision
Eurovision